Nikitino is a rural locality (a village) in Adzitarovsky Selsoviet, Karmaskalinsky District, Bashkortostan, Russia. The population was 127 as of 2010. There are 2 streets.

Geography 
Nikitino is located 47 km southwest of Karmaskaly (the district's administrative centre) by road. Staroyanbekovo is the nearest rural locality.

References 

Rural localities in Karmaskalinsky District